Egnatia is a former municipality in the Thessaloniki regional unit, Greece. Since the 2011 local government reform it is part of the municipality Volvi, of which it is a municipal unit. The seat of the municipality was in Profitis. The municipal unit has an area of 115.147 km2.

References

Populated places in Thessaloniki (regional unit)